Richard Carre, LL.D was Master of Magdalene College, Cambridge from 1546 until his ejection in 1559.

Notes

Masters of Magdalene College, Cambridge